The Keifer Croco farm was a stop along the Underground Railroad.  This was a parallel route to Wooster east of the route through modern Shreve.  Along with the John Croco farm, next door, served as waystations and hiding places for slaves moving northward, prior to the American Civil War.  From here, the escapee would be transported to Thomas Smiths farm.  Smith would then forward them to Isaac Daniel directly or via Daniel Clark in Apple Creek. The attic was designed to hide escaping slaves.  A trap door was hidden in the ceiling provided access.  The John Croco barn, a half-mile away had a cellar, where runaways could be sheltered. Bill and Rosanna Painter purchased and restored the Croco house around 2001.(pg 105)

References

National Register of Historic Places in Holmes County, Ohio
Italianate architecture in Ohio
Residential buildings completed in 1873
Houses in Holmes County, Ohio